The Silent Stranger is a 1924 American silent Western film directed by Albert S. Rogell and starring Fred Thomson, Hazel Keener, and Frank Hagney.

Plot
As described in a film magazine review, Jack Taylor, a supposed deaf-mute, arrives in Valley City snooping about in apparently aimless fashion, thereby winning recognition among the townspeople as "The Silent Stranger." Mail thefts have occurred and Dad Warner, postmaster, is threatened with discharge. Taylor suspects Sleeman, Warner's clerk, as being behind the thefts. Taylor is captured by the gang, escapes, stops another robbery, and saves Warner's daughter Lillian from the bandits. Taylor, who is really a United States Secret Service man charged with ending the mail thefts, brings about the arrest of the gang and wins the affection of the young woman.

Cast

References

Bibliography
 Donald W. McCaffrey & Christopher P. Jacobs. Guide to the Silent Years of American Cinema. Greenwood Publishing, 1999.

External links
 

1924 films
1924 Western (genre) films
1920s English-language films
American black-and-white films
Films directed by Albert S. Rogell
Film Booking Offices of America films
Silent American Western (genre) films
1920s American films